The 1924 Lehigh Brown and White football team was an American football team that represented Lehigh University as an independent during the 1924 college football season. In its third and final season under head coach James A. Baldwin, the team compiled a 4–1–3 record and outscored opponents by a total of 62 to 36. The team played its home games at Taylor Stadium in Bethlehem, Pennsylvania.

Schedule

References

Lehigh
Lehigh Mountain Hawks football seasons
Lehigh football